Rookley is a village and civil parish on the Isle of Wight. It is located five kilometres south of Newport near the centre of the island.

It has a country park on the site of the last working Isle of Wight brickworks. There is a pub at the country park and another, the "Chequers", a short distance from the village. The latter was the centre of the island's smuggling trade in the 18th century.

Southern Vectis bus route 3 serves the village on its way between Newport, Ventnor, Shanklin, Sandown and Ryde, including intermediate villages.

The Village Association Playing Field in Highwood Lane hosts Godshill Cricket Club who compete in Division Two of the Harwoods Renault Isle of Wight League. It is also home to Rookley Football Club which is managed by Paul Wright. Rookley have two teams in the island leagues: their firsts in League 2 and reserves in Combination 2.  Two major events are held in the field each year: Gardening Galore and Rookley Show.

External links
 Rookley tourist information, photos and accommodation guide

References

Civil parishes in the Isle of Wight
Villages on the Isle of Wight